Borile makes retro-modern bicycles and motorcycles in Padova, Italy, such as the B500CR, "a modern day interpretation of how a BSA Gold Star would look if it were produced today."  Borile's technically advanced yet aesthetically vintage motorcycles are at the center of a marked retro wave during the first decade of the 21st century.  Early Boriles were handmade, limited-production creations, but later models are mass-produced.

See also 

List of Italian companies
List of motorcycle manufacturers

Notes

External links
 Borile official website

Vehicle manufacturing companies established in 1988
Motorcycle manufacturers of Italy
Cycle manufacturers of Italy
Companies based in Veneto
Italian brands
Italian companies established in 1988